Quincy Roche (born February 10, 1998) is an American football outside linebacker for the Pittsburgh Steelers of the National Football League (NFL). He played college football at Temple and Miami.

Early years
Roche attended New Town High School in Owings Mills, Maryland. He played defensive end and tight end in high school. He committed to Temple University to play college football.

College career
Roche played at Temple from 2016 to 2019. During that time he recorded 137 tackles and 26 sacks. In 2019, he was the American Athletic Conference Defensive Player of the Year and was named an All-American by Sports Illustrated after recording 13 sacks. Prior to the 2020 season, Roche transferred to the University of Miami.

Professional career

Pittsburgh Steelers
Roche was drafted by the Pittsburgh Steelers in the sixth round, 216th overall, of the 2021 NFL Draft. On May 15, 2021, he signed his four-year rookie contract with Pittsburgh. He was waived on August 31, 2021.

New York Giants
On September 1, 2021, Roche was claimed off waivers by the New York Giants. In Week 9 game against the Las Vegas Raiders Roche recorded his first sack forced fumble of his career helping the Giants beat the Raiders, 23-16.

On August 30, 2022, Roche was released but signed to the Giants practice squad the next day. On September 10, 2022, Roche was elevated from the practice squad for the week 1 game against the Tennessee Titans. He was signed to the active roster on October 22. On November 23, 2022, he was waived and re-signed to the practice squad.

Pittsburgh Steelers (second stint)
On January 24, 2023, Roche signed a reserve/future contract with the Pittsburgh Steelers.

References

External links
Miami Hurricanes bio
Temple Owls bio

1998 births
Living people
Pittsburgh Steelers players
People from Randallstown, Maryland
Players of American football from Maryland
Sportspeople from Baltimore County, Maryland
American football defensive ends
Temple Owls football players
Miami Hurricanes football players
New York Giants players